The Catalonia men's national roller hockey team is the national team of Catalonia in international roller hockey. Nowadays it's not officially recognized by International Roller Sports Federation (FIRS).

History
In 2004 Catalonia was admitted to membership of FIRS, but this decision was revoked in November 2004 (Fresno Case) and again in November 2005, after the Court of Arbitration for Sport forced the FIRS to repeat the vote following the FIRS statute rules. Spanish officials were reported as having brought pressure to bear on a number of countries to reverse the previous vote. While it was an official member, Catalonia won the 2004 Rink Hockey Men's B World Championship.

In November 2006 Catalonia was admitted by Confederación Sudamericana del Patín and now plays the CSP Copa America, which it won in 2010.

!Catalonia also competes in the Golden Cup, which has been held in Blanes (Catalonia) every year since 2004.

Catalonia squad - 2011 Blanes Golden Cup 

Team Staff
 General Manager:
 Mechanic:

Coaching Staff
 Head Coach: Jordi Camps
 Assistant:

Titles
FIRS Roller Hockey World Cup "B" - 2004 (1)
Copa America - 2010 (1)
Golden Cup - 2004, 2005, 2008, 2009, 2010, 2011 (6)

See also
Catalonia women's national roller hockey team

References

External links
Website of Catalan Roller Sports Federation

National Roller Hockey Team
Roller Hockey Men
National roller hockey (quad) teams